The Grevensvænge hoard is a find of the late Nordic Bronze Age (roughly dating to between 800 BC and 500 BC), discovered in the late 18th century at Grevensvænge, Næstved Municipality, Zealand, Denmark.
The hoard consisted of seven bronze figurines. Its first mention is in 1779, where it is said to have been found in the ground "a few years ago". After their discovery, they were kept with the pastor at Herlufmagle, Marcus Schnabel.

A drawing of four of the figurines was made in 1779, by Schnabel. The drawing shows two kneeling figures of warriors with horned helmets and axes, a leaping acrobat, and a standing woman. Five of these figurines are now lost, while two were bought by the Danish National Museum in 1823 and 1839. 

Based on comparison with petroglyphs of the same era (e.g. Tanumshede, Sweden), it is assumed that the figurines were originally part of an ensemble arranged on a ship.

Both the twins motive and the cultic significance of the horned helmets, seems to have persisted into early Germanic culture. The kneeling warrior figures have been interpreted as the "Ashvins" type divine twins of early Indo-European religion, sons of the sky-god, known by the name of Alcis to Tacitus.

See also
Veksø helmets, bronze age helmets from Denmark, with similar horned design
Religion of Bronze Age Europe
Solar barge
Trundholm sun chariot

References
R. Djupedal, HC Broholm, 'Marcus Schnabel og Bronzealderfundet fra Grevensvaenge', Aarbøger 1952, 5–59. 
H. Thrane, 'Grevensvænge' in: Reallexikon der germanischen Altertumskunde, vol. 13, Walter de Gruyter, 1999, p. 23.

External links
 

Medieval European objects in the National Museum of Denmark

Nordic Bronze Age
Germanic archaeological artifacts
Archaeological artifacts
Bronze Age art
Archaeological discoveries in Denmark
Figurines
Ancient art in metal